Abu Shanak (also Romanized as Abū Shānak and Abū Shānek; also known as Abowlshānak, Bashnak, Bū Shānek, Sânel, Shānek, Shānel, and Shanel) is a village in Bahmanshir-e Jonubi Rural District, in the Central District of Abadan County, Khuzestan Province, Iran. At the 2006 census, its population was 1,031, in 161 families.

References 

Populated places in Abadan County